"My Eyes" is Fayray's 6th single. It was released on March 23, 2000 and peaked at #66. It was her first time self-producing a title track. The song was used in an "APLUS" commercial.

Track listing
My Eyes
My Eyes (Breakthrough version)
My Eyes (Catch Me If You Can)
My Eyes (Instrumental)

Charts 
"MY EYES" - Oricon Sales Chart (Japan)

External links
FAYRAY OFFICIAL SITE

2000 singles
Fayray songs
2000 songs
Songs written by Fayray